Sandig is a surname. Notable people with the surname include:

 Curt Sandig (born 1918), American football player
 Jochen Sandig (born 1968), German cultural entrepreneur
 Madeleine Sandig (born 1983), German cyclist
 Marita Sandig (born 1958), German rower
 Rudolf Sandig (1911–1994), German SS officer
 Ulrike Almut Sandig (born 1979), German writer